A sacral dimple (also termed pilonidal dimple or spinal dimple) is a small depression in the skin, located just above the buttocks. The name comes from the sacrum, the bone at the end of the spine, over which the dimples are found.  A sacral dimple is defined as a midline dimple less than 5 mm in diameter and no further than 2.5 cm from the anus without associated visible drainage or hairy tuft.

Sacral dimples are common benign congenital anomalies found in up to 4% of the population.  Other common benign congenital anomalies include supernumerary digits, third nipples and natal teeth.   Most sacaral dimple cases are minor and do not relate to any underlying medical problem, but some can result from disease, notably spina bifida. If so, this is usually the spina bifida occulta form, which is the least serious kind. A sacral dimple could also indicate a kidney problem of a kind that can be checked with an ultrasound.

Sacral dimples are often spotted in post-natal checks by pediatricians, who can check:

 whether the floor of the dimple is covered with skin;
 whether there is a tuft of hair in the dimple;
 whether there are potentially related problems such as weak lower limbs;
 the distance from the buttocks to the dimple (closer is better).

Classification 
Sacral dimples were selected for one study by the ICD9CM code of 685.1.

See also 
 Dimples of Venus
 Pilonidal sinus

References

Back anatomy
Congenital disorders
Cutaneous lesion